William Moir (1602–1674) was a Scottish mathematician who was principal of Marischal College (now known as Aberdeen University) from 1649 to 1661.

Life
He was born in Aberdeen the eldest William Moir of Scottistoun (1570-1623), treasurer of Aberdeen City Council, and his wife, Janet Rae (b.1585). He studied at Marischal College graduating MA in 1616.

He was a Baillie in Aberdeen. In January 1641 he was appointed Professor of Mathematics at Marischal College. In 1649 he replaced Patrick Dun as Principal of Marischal College, also continuing his role as Professor of Mathematics. He resigned both posts in 1661.

He died in Aberdeen on 15 November 1674.

Publications
Geometry and the Mechanical Part of Mathematics

Family
He married twice: firstly Jean Gordon daughter of Gilbert Gordon of Gordon's Mill, by whom he had two sons and a daughter.

On 10 August 1628 he married Jeane Forbes (1605-1696) at the Kirk of St Nicholas in Aberdeen. By his second marriage he had one son and five daughters.

References

1602 births
1674 deaths
People from Aberdeen
Academics of the University of Aberdeen
Scottish mathematicians